Ib Andersen (born 14 December 1954) is a Danish ballet dancer, choreographer, and painter.

Biography

Early days
Born in Copenhagen, Andersen was first exposed to dance through ballroom dancing. At age 7, he was accepted into the Royal Danish Ballet School, where he studied with Kirsten Ralov, Hans Brenaa, Flemming Flindt, and Vera Volkova. He also studied in Germany, France, and the United States, where he took classes at the School of American Ballet. At age 18, in 1972, he graduated from the Copenhagen school into the Royal Danish Ballet as an apprentice. He was accepted into the corps de ballet in 1973 and promoted to "solo dancer" (principal) in 1975, when he was 20. At that age, he was the youngest principal dancer in the company's history.

Ballet
On stage at the Royal Danish Theater in Copenhagen, Andersen proved himself an exemplary dancer in the ballets of August Bournonville, which are at the heart of the repertory of the Royal Danish Ballet. Exhibiting his mastery of brilliant allegro dancing, with sparkling batterie and flying elevation, he appeared in leading roles in Napoli, Flower Festival in Genzano, Far from Denmark, Kermesse in Bruges, and A Folk Tale. His technical precision and brilliance were also displayed in Harald Lander's Études as well as in works by other Danish choreographers. Besides these, he danced in classic ballets such as The Nutcracker, Coppélia, and Giselle as well as in many modern ballets, creating the role of the Boy in the 1976 revival of Rudi van Dantzig's Monument for a Dead Boy and dancing the demanding part of The Chosen in Glen Tetley's Le Sacre de Printemps in 1978.

New York City Ballet
In 1980, Andersen joined the New York City Ballet on George Balanchine’s invitation and plunged into the task of learning thirty-five ballets within the first three months of his tenure there, including the intricate choreography of Balanchine's Symphony in C (first movement) and Ballo della Regina. So successful was he at adapting himself to the Balanchine style that the great choreographer created principal roles for him in Ballade (1980), Robert Schumann's Davidsbündlertänze (1980), and Mozartiana (1981). Peter Martins and Jerome Robbins also created roles for him in a number of works. Altogether, Andersen appeared in some sixty ballets during his ten years with the company.

Guest Ballet Master
After suffering a hip injury in 1988, Andersen returned to the stage but eventually decided to retire from New York City Ballet in 1990. He then began a second career as a guest ballet master for companies around the world, staging works by Balanchine, Bournonville, Robbins, and others. He has been working as a répétiteur for the George Balanchine Trust, an organization formed to oversee the licensing and production of Balanchine works.

Phoenix, Arizona
Following a brief stint as ballet master for Pittsburgh Ballet Theatre, Andersen moved to Phoenix, Arizona, attracted not only by the dramatic scenery but, he says, by the "crystal clear" sunlight that is ideal for painting, one of his hobbies. In 2000 he was appointed artistic director of Ballet Arizona, where he oversees a repertory of classical and contemporary ballets, including works he has created specifically for the company. He has also staged such classics as Coppélia, Swan Lake, and The Nutcracker and, as might be expected, a number of works by Balanchine.

Appearances on video and film 
Andersen is a featured dancer in the Danish documentary film At danse Bournonville (English title: Dancing Bournonville, 1979). He appears in leading roles in videos of Balanchine's Robert Schumann's Davidsbündlertänze (1981; The Balanchine Library, Nonesuch, 1995), Mozartiana (1983; PBS, "A New York City Ballet Tribute to George Balanchine"), and A Midsummer Night's Dream (1986), in which he dances the role of Oberon. He also appears in the "Dance in America" television broadcasts of Peter Martins's Concerto for Two Solo Pianos (1983) and Valse Triste (1991) and in archival footage in the documentary film Jerome Robbins: Something to Dance About by Kultur Video in 2008. Among many videos of rehearsals and performances with New York City Ballet that can be viewed in the Jerome Robbins Dance Collection of the New York Public Library for the Performing Arts, Andersen can be seen in Balanchine Continued, at Ballet Arizona, part of the "Works and Process" performance series at the Guggenheim Museum in New York City, recorded in November 2004.

Selected works
 1987: 1-2-3–1-2 (music, Schoenberg, J. Strauss Jr., Lizst), Royal Danish Ballet
 1988: Baroque Variations (music, Foss), New York City Ballet
 1989: Fête Galante (music, Couperin), Royal Danish Ballet
 1991: The New World (music, Dvořák), Slovenian National Theater Ballet, Ljubljana
 1992: Carnaval (music, Schumann and others), Royal Ballet of Flanders, Antwerp
 1993: Simple Symphony (music, Britten), Tokyo
 1994: Brandenburg Concerti (music, Bach), Pacific Northwest Ballet, Seattle
 1999: Giselle (music, Adam), Les Grands Ballets Canadiens, Montreal
 2004: Mosaik (music, Chopin, Berlioz, Schubert, and others), Ballet Arizona
 2007: Play (music, Mozart, Schubert, Britten, Pärt, Stravinsky), Ballet Arizona
 2008: Dance of the Hours (music, Ponchielli), Ballet Arizona
 2009: Sueños (music, Massenet, Rossini), Ballet Arizona
 2010: Diversions (music, Britten), Ballet Arizona
 2012: Topia (music, TBA), Ballet Arizona

References

External links

 Ib Andersen on the website of Ballet Arizona
 Ib Andersen in the Oxford Reference Database

1954 births
Living people
Danish male ballet dancers
Danish choreographers
New York City Ballet principal dancers